Arnulf Meffle (born 1 December 1957) is a former West German handball player who competed in the 1984 Summer Olympics.

He was a member of the West German handball team which won the silver medal. He played all six matches and scored fourteen goals.

References 
 
 

1957 births
Living people
German male handball players
Handball players at the 1984 Summer Olympics
Olympic handball players of West Germany
Olympic medalists in handball
Medalists at the 1984 Summer Olympics
Olympic silver medalists for West Germany